Tota Roy Chowdhury is an Indian actor and martial artist based in Kolkata. He predominantly appears in Bengali and Hindi cinema. His notable roles include Feluda in the web TV series Feluda Pherot based on Satyajit Ray's Feluda series.

He made his film debut with Prabhat Roy's National Award winning Bengali film Lathi (1996). His breakthrough role came with Rituparno Ghosh's National Award winning Bengali film Chokher Bali (2003).

Career

Early career 
During his second year in college, he made up his mind to join the Indian Army and was preparing for the CDS exams when fate intervened and he was asked by the  director Prabhat Roy to play a small role in his film. That one film brought other offers and soon he decided to become a professional actor. After starring in a few commercially successful films, he was spotted by director Rituparno Ghosh and cast opposite Nandita Das in his film Shubho Mahurat.

Breakthrough 
Chowdhury was cast again opposite Aishwarya Rai in Rituparno's Tagore adaptation, Chokher Bali. He won several awards, including the BFJA Award for the Best Actor. 
CAREER
After Chokher Bali he did several films both commercial and mainstream like Aborto, Biye Not Out,Choukaath, Benche Thakaar Gaan, Bolo Na Tumi Amaar, Paglu-2,Villain, Shapath which cemented his position in the Bengali Film Industry as a dependable actor and a solid performer, one of the very few actors loved by both the class and mass.

He did an extended cameo in the AR Murugadoss directed Kaththi which introduced him into Tamil film industry. He also starred in the Sujoy Ghosh directed short film Ahalya alongside Soumitra Chatterjee and Radhika Apte. This short film went viral and he was noticed for his powerful presence as the police inspector He played the role of Arun in the film Kahaani 2: Durga Rani Singh; directed by Sujoy Ghosh opposite Vidya Balan, which got him noticed by the Hindi film industry. His second Hindi film Indu Sarkar directed by Madhur Bhandarkar was released in 2017. He was cast opposite Kirti Kulhari and his portrayal of the troubled government servant Navin fetched him recognition and praises. Industry veteran Anupam Kher tweeted 'Tota in Indu Sarkar is a brilliant piece of casting ‘ and Asutosh Gowariker tweeted 'Superb performance by Tota Roy Choudhury ‘. His next film was Helicopter Eela where he was cast opposite Kajol. The film was directed by Pradeep Sarkar. His portrayal of the psychologically disturbed Arun fetched him good reviews.
He then did a cameo in The Girl on the Train, a Hindi remake of English film of the same name. The film co-starring Parineeti Chopra, Aditi Rao Hydari and Kirti Kulhari was produced by Reliance Entertainment. 
He also plays the iconic Bengali detective Feluda created by Satyajit Ray, in a web series directed by the multiple national award winner Srijit Mukherji. 
Currently he is a part of Karan Johar's directorial comeback Rocky aur Rani ki prem kahaani; along with Ranveer Singh and Alia Bhatt.

Filmography

Films

Television and Streaming television 

 Ekhane Aakash Neel (2008-2009) as Dr. Romit Sen
 Taranath Tantrik (2016); based on the character created by Taradas Bandopadhyay
 Sreemoyee (2019-2021) as Rohit Sen
 Feluda Pherot (Season 1) (2020) as Feluda; Based on the Bengali novel Chhinnamastar Abhishap by Satyajit Ray 
 Feluda Pherot (Season 2)(Unreleased) as Feluda; Based on the Bengali novel 'Joto Kando Kathmandute' by Satyajit Ray 
 Feludar Goyendagiri (Season 1) (2022) as Feluda; Based on the Bengali novel 'Darjeeling Jomjomat' by Satyajit Ray
 Feludar Goyendagiri (Season 2) (2023) as Feluda; Based on the Bengali novel Bhuswargo Bhayankar by Satyajit Ray

Awards

References

External links

Indian male film actors
Living people
Male actors from Kolkata
Bengali male actors
Male actors in Bengali cinema
University of Calcutta alumni
1976 births
20th-century Indian male actors